General Lee Jing-ok (Hangul:이징옥, hanja:李澄玉, 1399 - October 20, 1453) was a general of the Korean Joseon dynasty.

References

External links 
 Lee Jing-ok 
 Lee Jing-ok 
 Lee Jing-ok 
 민족사를 빛낸 난세의 영웅 충강공 이징옥(李澄玉) 장군 
 충남 공주에 박제상 사당, 이징옥 위패 있다 양산신문 2005.09.07 

1399 births
1453 deaths
Korean generals
15th-century Korean people
Korean revolutionaries
Executed Korean people
Korean military personnel
Executed military personnel
15th-century executions